Kotha Kothaga is a 2022 Indian Telugu-language romantic drama film directed by  Hanumaan Vasamsetty and starring Ajay Aman and Virti Vaghani.

The film was released on 9 September 2022.

Plot 
Sidhu and Rajee study at the same engineering college. Sidhu is deeply in love with Rajee although Rajee doesn't reciprocate his feelings.

Cast 
Ajay Aman as Sidhu 
Virti Vaghani as Rajee 
Kalyani Natarajan
 Kumar Sai
 Pawan Tej as Ram 
Y. Kasi Viswanath
Lavanya Reddy as Sathya

Soundtrack 
The songs are composed by Shekar Chandra.

Reception 
A critic from The Times of India wrote that "Unfortunately, while some scenes and a couple of songs appeal to the senses, the film gets undone by cliches". A critic from Sakshi Post wrote that "Kotha Kothaga is a beautiful love story". A critic from Filmibeat wrote that "the technical aspects of the movie were stronger than the content and performance of the actors".

References 

2022 romantic drama films
2020s Telugu-language films
Indian romantic drama films